Dmitry Matveyevich Smirnov (27 October 1919 in Shilovo, Seredskii District, 
Ivanovo Oblast, Soviet Union – 14 April 2005) was a Soviet mathematician working in group theory and Jónsson–Tarski algebras.

References

Bibliography 
 

Soviet mathematicians
1919 births
2005 deaths
Russian mathematicians
Group theorists